The Roman Catholic Diocese of Makurdi is a diocese located in the city of Makurdi, Benue State in the Ecclesiastical province of Abuja in Nigeria.

History
 July 9, 1934: Established as Apostolic Prefecture of Benue from the Apostolic Vicariate of Western Nigeria
 April 18, 1950: Renamed as the Apostolic Prefecture of Oturkpo
 April 2, 1959: Promoted as Diocese of Oturkpo
 June 28, 1960: Renamed as Diocese of Makurdi

Special churches
The Cathedral is  Our Lady of Perpetual Help Cathedral in Makurdi.

Bishops
 Prefect Apostolic of Benue (Latin Church)
 Fr. Giuseppe Kirsten, C.S.Sp. (26 Feb 1937 – 1947)
 Bishop of Oturkpo (Roman rite)
 Bishop James Hagan, C.S.Sp. (20 Mar 1948  – 8 Mar 1960 see below)
 Bishops of Makurdi (Latin Church)
 Bishop James Hagan, C.S.Sp. (see above 8 Mar 1960  – 29 Mar 1966)
 Bishop Donal Joseph Murray, C.S.Sp. (11 Jan 1968  – 2 Jun 1989)
 Bishop Athanasius Atule Usuh (2 Jun 1989  – 28 Mar 2015)
 Bishop Wilfred Chikpa Anagbe, CMF (28 Mar 2015 -)

Coadjutor Bishop
Wilfred Chikpa Anagbe, C.M.F. (2014-2015)
Athanasius Atule Usuh (1987-1989)

Auxiliary Bishop
William Amove Avenya (2008-2012), appointed Bishop of Gboko

Other priests of this diocese who became bishops
Peter Iornzuul Adoboh, appointed Bishop of Katsina-Ala in 2012
Michael Ekwoy Apochi (priest here, 1986-1995), appointed Bishop of Otupko in 2002
Matthew Ishaya Audu, appointed Bishop of Lafia in 2000

See also
Roman Catholicism in Nigeria

Sources
 GCatholic.org Information
 Catholic Hierarchy

Roman Catholic dioceses in Nigeria
Christian organizations established in 1934
Roman Catholic dioceses and prelatures established in the 20th century
Roman Catholic Ecclesiastical Province of Abuja